Lapin is a rural locality (a khutor) in Dubrovskoye Rural Settlement, Kikvidzensky District, Volgograd Oblast, Russia. The population was 54 as of 2010. There are 3 streets.

Geography 
Lapin is located 7 km west of Preobrazhenskaya (the district's administrative centre) by road. Preobrazhenskaya is the nearest rural locality.

References 

Rural localities in Kikvidzensky District